Alpine Skiing at the 1998 Winter Olympics consisted of ten alpine skiing events. The speed events were held at Hakuba and the technical events at Shiga Kogen. There were a number of race postponements due to weather; the events began on 10 February and ended on 21 February.

Medal summary
Nine nations won medals in alpine skiing, with Austria winning the most with eleven (3 gold, 4 silver, 4 bronze). Katja Seizinger led the individual medal table, with two gold medals and a bronze, while Hermann Maier was the most successful male skier, with two gold medals. Zali Steggall's bronze medal was the first individual medal at the Winter Olympics for Australia.

Medal table

Source:

Men's events

Source:

Women's events

Source:

Course information

Source:

Participating nations
Forty-nine nations sent alpine skiers to compete in the events in Nagano. Armenia, Belarus, the Czech Republic, Ireland, Lithuania, Macedonia, South Africa, Uruguay, and Uzbekistan made their Olympic alpine skiing debuts. Below is a list of the competing nations; in parentheses are the number of national competitors.

See also
Alpine skiing at the 1998 Winter Paralympics

References

External links
FIS-Ski.com – alpine skiing – 1998 Winter Olympics – Nagano, Japan
CNNSI coverage and schedule

 
1998 Winter Olympics events
Alpine skiing at the Winter Olympics
Winter Olympics
Alpine skiing competitions in Japan